Ibrahima Ousmane Arthur Dabo (born 22 July 1992) is a footballer who plays as a goalkeeper for JS Saint-Pierroise. Born in France, he represents the Madagascar national team.

Club career
Born in Créteil, Dabo has played for Créteil, Créteil B, FC Gobelins and JS Saint-Pierroise.

International career
Dabo's is of Senegalese descent, and his grandmother was born in Madagascar. He made his international debut for Madagascar in 2017.

References

1992 births
Living people
Association football goalkeepers
People with acquired Malagasy citizenship
Malagasy footballers
Madagascar international footballers
Malagasy people of Senegalese descent
French footballers
Sportspeople from Créteil
French sportspeople of Malagasy descent
French sportspeople of Senegalese descent
Championnat National players
US Créteil-Lusitanos players
Paris 13 Atletico players
JS Saint-Pierroise players
Division d'Honneur players
Championnat National 3 players
2019 Africa Cup of Nations players
Footballers from Val-de-Marne
Black French sportspeople